Lamoria eumeces is a species of snout moth in the genus Lamoria. It was described by Turner in 1913. It is found in Australia.

References

Moths described in 1913
Tirathabini